Crazy Fellow is a 2022 Indian Telugu-language romantic drama film directed by Phani Krishna Siriki and starring Aadi Saikumar, Digangana Suryavanshi and Mirnaa Menon in her Telugu debut.

Cast 

 Aadi Saikumar as Abhiram alias Nani
 Digangana Suryavanshi as Madhu
 Mirnaa Menon as Chinni
 Anish Kuruvilla as Abhiram's brother
 Vinodhini Vaidyanathan as Abhiram's sister-in-law
 Narra Srinu
 Saptagiri as Abhiram's coworker
Ravi Prakash 
Pawan
 Priya Hegde
 Deepthi Naidu

Reception 
A critic from The Times of India wrote that "Watch it if you don’t mind a simple story aided by good performances and numerous cinematic liberties". A critic from The New Indian Express wrote that "Overall, Crazy Fellow has all those ingredients and entertaining moments, making it a good time-pass watch for this weekend". A critic from 123telugu wrote that "On the whole, Crazy Fellow is a light hearted triangular love story which has okay comedy and good performances".

References

External links